This article describes about the squads for the 2022 UEFA European Under-17 Championship.

Group A

Germany 
Head coach: Marc Meister

Israel 
Head coach: Gadi Brumer

Italy 
Head coach: Bernardo Corradi

Luxembourg 
Head coach: Mario Mutsch

Group B

Bulgaria 
Head coach: Yordan Petkov

France 
Head coach: José Alcocer

Netherlands 
Head coach: Mischa Visser

Poland 
Head coach: Dariusz Gęsior

Group C

Belgium 
Head coach: David Penneman

Serbia 
Head coach: Radovan Krivokapić

Spain 
Head coach: Julen Guerrero

Turkey 
Head coach: Övünç Başar

Group D

Denmark 
Head coach: Kenneth Weber

Portugal 
Head coach: José Lima

Scotland 
Head coach: Brian McLaughlin

Sweden 
Head coach: Roger Franzén

References 

UEFA European Under-17 Championship squads